The Rough Guide to the Music of the Andes is a world music compilation album originally released in 1996. Part of the World Music Network Rough Guides series, the album features the music of the Andes Mountains of South America, focusing especially on the music of Bolivia, whose musicians contributed eleven tracks. Also featured is Peru (three tracks) and Chile (two tracks). The compilation was produced by Phil Stanton, co-founder of the World Music Network.

Adam Greenberg of AllMusic gave the album four stars, calling it a "good starting point", containing "every style the producers can find" from the region. Michaelangelo Matos, writing for the Chicago Reader, described the release as "folkie" and "pretty", but that it should be listened to in small doses by anyone but "panpipe addicts".

Track listing

References 

1996 compilation albums
World Music Network Rough Guide albums